The British Rail Class 09 is a class of 0-6-0 diesel locomotive designed primarily for shunting and short-distance freight trips along branch lines.

The 26 locos are nearly identical to the more numerous Class 08 shunting locomotives but have different gearing, giving a higher top speed of 27.5 mph (44 km/h) at the expense of a lower tractive effort. They were introduced from 1959 to 1962 and latterly operated in the Southern Region of British Railways, although some of the class were originally allocated to depots in the Midlands and North. Further locomotives were converted from Class 08 in 1992 and, following this and privatisation in 1997, the class has been distributed much further afield.

Passenger operations
Although not normally considered for passenger work, Class 09s were recorded working passenger trains between Clapham Junction and Kensington Olympia when the booked Class 33 diesel was unavailable.

They were also used on Railtours which needed to depart Brighton heading along the West Coastway Line or vice versa. To achieve this the 09 worked between Brighton and Preston Park, allowing the main tour locomotive to work the train forward via the Cliftonville tunnel and Hove. The connection to the West Coastway Line at Brighton can only be used by four car trains due to the arrangement of the points and track.

Liveries

Post-Privatisation
The following liveries have been carried since the privatisation of British Rail:
 09006/007/019/024 carried Mainline Freight livery
 09008 in EWS livery
 09025 in Connex Livery
 09204 in Arriva TrainCare livery.
 09201 in Railfreight grey and is currently in the Knottingley area working at EWS Depot

Sub-classes

The original 26 locomotives (built 1959–1962) became sub-class 09/0 when further locomotives were modified from Class 08s in 1992 which became subclasses Classes 09/1 and 09/2.
There were variations, which were given the following TOPS design codes:

Class 09/0

Classes 09/1 & 09/2

Preservation
12 members of the class have been preserved

 09001 Ex DB Schenker at Peak Rail (Heritage Shunters Trust)
 D3668 (09004) at Swindon & Cricklade Railway
 D3721 (09010) at South Devon Railway
 D4100 (09012) Dick Hardy at Severn Valley Railway
 09015 at Avon Valley Railway 
 09017 at National Railway Museum
 09018 at Bluebell Railway
 09019 at West Somerset Railway
 09024 at East Lancashire Railway
 D4113 (09025) at Lavender Line
 09026 Cedric Wares at Spa Valley Railway
 09107 at Severn Valley Railway

Model railways
Lima produced a range of Class 09s in OO gauge.

Hornby Railways and Bachmann have also produced 00 gauge models of Class 09 locomotives.

References and sources

References

Sources

Further reading

External links 

 SEMG gallery

09
English Electric locomotives
C locomotives
Standard gauge locomotives of Great Britain
Railway locomotives introduced in 1959
Diesel-electric locomotives of Great Britain
Shunting locomotives